The Ker–Frisbie doctrine is applied in the context of extradition and generally holds that criminal defendants may be prosecuted in United States courts regardless of whether their presence has been obtained through the use of applicable extradition treaties.

History 
In Ker v. Illinois, a messenger forcibly kidnapped the defendant from Peru and brought him back to the United States, even though he had been sent to Peru with a valid warrant and instructions to obtain the defendant with the cooperation of the local authorities. Addressing Ker's due process challenge, the Supreme Court of the United States held that "such forcible abduction is no sufficient reason why the party should not answer when brought within the jurisdiction of the court which has the right to try him for such an offence, and presents no valid objection to his trial in such court".

Frisbie v. Collins, presented a case in which the defendant was tried in Michigan after being abducted by Michigan authorities in Chicago. Applying its decision in Ker, the Supreme Court upheld the conviction over challenges based on due process and federal kidnapping laws. 

More recently, the Supreme Court relied on the Ker–Frisbie doctrine in United States v. Alvarez-Machain, . Álvarez Machaín, a Mexican citizen, was abducted and brought to the United States at the direction of the Drug Enforcement Administration. The Court rejected the argument that such abductions undermine the usefulness of extradition treaties, and it refused to read general principles of international law weighing against such abductions into the Mexican extradition treaty.

See also
Extraordinary rendition

Further reading

American legal terminology
Extradition
Legal doctrines and principles